"Waves" is a song recorded by the American recording artist Miguel for his third studio album, Wildheart (2015). It is the third single from the album and was released in 2016 through RCA Records.

The song is best-known for a remix version, produced by Australian psychedelic music project Tame Impala, which was released on the singer's 2016 extended play, Rogue Waves. The EP contains reimagined takes on the original song, from artists like Kacey Musgraves and Travis Scott. The Tame Impala remix received a music video, which depicts the musicians on a beach.

Music video
The song's original music video depicts Miguel performing at a club, interspersed with shots of him floating in water with his necklaces detached.

The remix video, directed by Jennifer Massaux, consists of clips of Miguel and Kevin Parker of Tame Impala along a furniture-littered beach, gazing upon the sky against a raging tempest. The clip only selects a minute and a half of the remix's original runtime. Chris Riotta at Mic further described the clip: "[It] shows both singers seated as waves come crashing ashore on a dimly lit beach. Both Miguel and Parker stare off into the distance as swarms of birds float above them." The video was shot in Los Angeles, with Miguel joking that "it only rains in LA when you’re filming [with Tame Impala]."

Reception
The Tame Impala remix received acclaim; author Michael Gonik at Okayplayer suggested "Tame Impala's variation has proven to have just as much staying power as the original." Collin Robinson at Stereogum called Parker's iteration the standout piece from the Rogue Waves EP, while Nastassia Baroni at Music Feeds dubbed the remix a "masterpiece". Jayson Greene at Pitchfork "Tame Impala are an irresistibly remix-able rock band because they offer so much good stuff to strip out and build around—the big drum breaks, the killer bass lines, ghostly, detached vocals. [..]  it's clear from his take on "Waves" that [Parker] is becoming a capital-P Producer, separate from his own project." Musgraves' reimagining also received praise. "The singer transforms "Waves" into something nocturnal and mysterious, all dimmed lights and smoke, as tinkling percussion, rumbling guitar and wisps of steel faintly echo into the distance," wrote Rolling Stone contributor Jon Freeman. Brennan Carley of Spin called it the best of the bunch: "Something about the pair trading off lines makes the already sensual song all that more resonant, and the steel guitar quivering in the background is a countrified cherry on top of the whole gorgeous arrangement."

Charts and certifications

Personnel

Musicians
Miguel – vocals, production, songwriting
Jack Davey – additional vocals
Nathan Perez – songwriting
Production
Flippa – production
Happy Perez – production
Manny Marroquin – mixing
Chris Galland – mixing assistance
Ike Schultz – mixing assistance

References

RCA Records singles
Miguel (singer) songs
2016 songs
2016 singles
Songs written by Miguel (singer)
Songs written by Happy Perez